Bierbrand (also known as Bierschnaps or Eau de vie de bière) is a liquor produced by distilling beer. Bierbrand produced in the European Union and Switzerland is required to contain at least 38% alcohol by volume and retain the flavor profile of beer. Additives such as neutral spirits or flavorings are prohibited, except for caramel color. 

It is a traditional spirit in the German state of Bavaria, where small brewers would convert excess or leftover beer, a perishable good, into a spirit with a longer shelf-life. It can be consumed neat, either chilled or at room temperature, or is sometimes mixed into beer to make a boilermaker. Bierbrand is also occasionally used as an ingredient in Bierlikör.

Bierbrand differs from whiskey in that it is not aged in oak barrels, and whiskey is made without hops.

References 

German beer culture
Distilled drinks
Pages translated from German Wikipedia